Milea River may refer to:

 Milei, a tributary of the Bâsca in Buzău County, Romania
 Milea, a tributary of the Siriul Mare in Buzău County, Romania

See also 
 Milea (disambiguation), several villages in Greece